Union Sportive de Ouagadougou is a Burkinabé football club based in Ouagadougou. They play their home games at the Stade Municipal.

The club plays in red and white. It was founded in 1961.

Achievements
Burkinabé Premier League: 2
 1967, 1983

Coupe du Faso: 1
 2005

Burkinabé SuperCup: 2
 2004–05, 2007–08

Performance in CAF competitions
 African Cup of Champions Clubs: 1 appearance
1968 – First Round
1984 – Preliminary Round

CAF Confederation Cup: 2 appearances
2006 – Preliminary Round
2009 – First Round

Football clubs in Burkina Faso
Association football clubs established in 1961
Sport in Ouagadougou
1961 establishments in Upper Volta